The Big Rivers Australian Football League (formerly the Katherine District Football League) is an Australian rules football competition in the Northern Territory, Australia based in the Katherine region.

Current clubs

Previous clubs

Premierships (Mens)
1988/89 Kirby's Agents 
1989/90 Rowlands 
1990/91 Eastside (* Formerly known as Rowlands FC)
1991/92 Katherine South 
1992/93 Katherine South 
1993/94 Eastside 
1994/95 Katherine South 
1995/96 Katherine South 
1996/97 Katherine South 
1997/98 Katherine South 
1998/99 Eastside
1999/00 Ngukurr
2001 Arnhem Bombers 
2002 Arnhem Crows 
2003 Arnhem Crows 
2004 Arnhem Crows
2005 Lajamanu
2006 Arnhem Crows
2007 Ngukurr
2008 Lajamanu
2009 Arnhem Crows
2010 Beswick
2011 Arnhem Crows
2012 Katherine Camels
2013 Eastside FC
2014 Eastside FC
2015 Eastside FC
2016 Eastside FC
2017 Eastside FC
2018 Katherine South
2019 Katherine Camels
2020 Katherine South

2011 Ladder 
																			
																			
FINALS

2012 Ladder 
																			
																			
FINALS

See also
AFL Northern Territory
Northern Territory Football League
Australian rules football in the Northern Territory

References

External links
 

Australian rules football competitions in the Northern Territory
Katherine, Northern Territory